A Stranger in Paso Bravo (also known as Paso Bravo) is a 1968 Italian-Spanish Spaghetti Western film directed by Salvatore Rosso. It was the first and only film directed by Rosso, who had previously been assistant of a number of directors, notably Pietro Germi.  The film was remade in 1969 by Antonio Margheriti as And God Said to Cain; despite being the same story and having the main characters sharing the same names, the two films list different screenwriters. The film underperformed at the Italian box office, grossing only 34 million lire.

Plot

Cast

 Anthony Steffen as Gary Hamilton
 Eduardo Fajardo as Acombar
 Giulia Rubini as  Anna
  José Jaspe as  Paquito
  Vassili Karis as  Donny
 José Calvo as  Seller of Water
 Adriana Ambesi as  Rosy
  Antonio Cintado as  Danny
  Claudio Biava as  Clark
 Ignazio Leone as  Jaime
 Corrado Olmi as Jonathan

References

External links
 

1960s Italian-language films
Spaghetti Western films
1968 Western (genre) films
1968 films
1968 directorial debut films
1960s Italian films